George Vanden Bempde (earlier Johnstone) (29 May 1720 – 29 April 1792), 3rd Marquess of Annandale, succeeded James Johnstone, 2nd Marquess of Annandale on his death in 1730 (but in practice from 1733), and enjoyed that title from then to his own death, whereupon the title became extinct.

His change of surname from Johnstone to Vanden Bempde was a condition of receiving an inheritance from John Vanden Bempde, and was confirmed by an Act of Parliament of 1744.

See also 
 Earl of Annandale and Hartfell
 Sir Richard Vanden-Bempde-Johnstone, 1st Baronet
 Johnstone Baronets of Westerhall

References 

1720 births
1792 deaths
Marquesses of Annandale